Mario Domínguez Franco (born 10 February 2004), sometimes known as just Domi, is a Spanish professional footballer who plays as a forward for Valencia CF Mestalla.

Club career
A youth product of Granada CF, Domínguez moved to the youth academy of Valencia CF in 2019. In May 2022, he started training with the senior Valencia team after scoring 11 goals and 8 assists in 24 matches in his debut season with their youth side. He made his La Liga and professional debut with Valencia in a 1–1 tie with RCD Espanyol on 14 May 2022, coming on as a substitute in the 68th minute.

Playing style
Domínguez is a fast and disciplined footballer with a good eye for goal. He is a good fit for high-pressure systems, or to attack a low-block defense. In a 4-4-2 formation he can act as a pure number 9 or second striker.

References

External links
 
 
 

2004 births
Living people
Footballers from Granada
Spanish footballers
La Liga players
Segunda Federación players
Valencia CF players
Valencia CF Mestalla footballers
Association football forwards